Blautia is a genus of anaerobic bacteria. Upon introduction, this genus mostly consisted of species previously described in the genus Ruminococcus.

References

Lachnospiraceae
Taxa described in 2008